Dodangoda is a surname. It may refer to:

Amarasiri Dodangoda (1941–2009), Sri Lankan politician and minister
Isuru Dodangoda, Sri Lankan politician, former provincial councillor and Member of Parliament

See also
Dodangoda Divisional Secretariat, a Divisional Secretariat of Kalutara District, of Western Province, Sri Lanka

Sinhalese surnames